The Cheyenne Frontier Days Arena is a 19,000-seat stadium in Cheyenne, Wyoming, United States.  It annually hosts the Cheyenne Frontier Days Rodeo, the evening Night Show, and in the past it hosted chuckwagon races of the Cheyenne Frontier Days.

Concerts held at the Arena for Cheyenne (in the least populous state in the U.S.) Frontier Days include Johnny Cash in '77 and '86, Chicago in '90, Garth Brooks (from Oklahoma) in '93 and ‘21, Chris LeDoux (from Kaycee) in '97, Doobie Brothers in '02, Brad Paisley in '04, Kenny Chesney in '04, Ted Nugent in '05, Keith Urban in '06, Taylor Swift in '09, Brooks & Dunn in '10, Luke Bryan in '13, Lady Antebellum in '14, Flo Rida and Jason Derulo in '17, and Nickelback (from Alberta) in '18.

References

External links

Sports venues in Wyoming
Rodeo venues in Wyoming
Horse racing venues in Wyoming
Rodeo in the United States